The Final Game is a 1998 German thriller film directed by Sigi Rothemund, it was written by Timo Berndt and Borris Brandt.

Plot
70,000 football-fans stream into Berlin Olympic Stadium in order to see the final of the DFB-Pokal. The men of the security center pay no attention to what is happening. In front of them several armed terrorists attack the central, five hostages arrive in the hands of gangsters. Kant, the gang leader, orders his men to close and lock all exit doors, because the game ends in a few minutes. It comes under the stadium visitors to a mass panic. Security Chief Bender has no chance to stop Kant alone, in addition he paid Kant using an old account.

Cast

Production
Some of the scenes were shot on 1 March 1998 in the Bundesliga match Hertha BSC against Hansa Rostock.

Release
It premiered on 9 June 1998 as TV production on Pro 7 under the German title Das Finale. In Hungary had a theatrical release on 12 April 2005.

References

External links

1998 films
1998 television films
1998 action thriller films
1998 crime thriller films
1990s psychological thriller films
German television films
Films about terrorism in Europe
Films set in Germany
German crime thriller films
1990s German-language films
German-language television shows
Films directed by Sigi Rothemund
Films set in Berlin
German association football films
German heist films
Films about hostage takings
1990s German films
ProSieben original programming